Omniplan may refer to

OmniPlan, management software created by The Omni Group
Omniplan (architects), an American architecture design firm